Mirror ball or Mirrorball may refer to:

Mirror Ball (Neil Young album), 1995, featuring Pearl Jam
Mirrorball (Sarah McLachlan album), 1999
Mirrorball (Def Leppard album), 2011
"Mirrorball" (song), a song by Taylor Swift from her 2020 album Folklore
"Mirrorball", a song by Paul Weller from his 2020 album On Sunset
"Mirrorball", a song by Blur from their 2015 album The Magic Whip
"Mirrorball", a song by Elbow from their 2008 album The Seldom Seen Kid
"Mirrorball", a song by Everything But the Girl from their 1996 album Walking Wounded
"Mirror Ball" (song), a 2008 maxi-single by Japanese rock band Alice Nine
Mirrorball (TV pilot), 2000 UK sitcom one-off
AN/ALQ-144, US infra-red guided missile countermeasure device, nicknamed "mirror-ball"

See also
Disco ball
Yard globe